The Kidnapping Act 1961, is a Malaysian laws which enacted to provide for the detection and punishment of the offences of abduction, wrongful restraint and wrongful confinement for ransom and other related offences and for matters incidental thereto.

Structure
The Kidnapping Act 1961, in its current form (1 January 2006), consists of 16 sections and no schedule (including 5 amendments), without separate Part.
 Section 1: Short title and application
 Section 2: Interpretation
 Section 3: Abduction, wrongful restraint or wrongful confinement for ransom
 Section 4: Seizure and forfeiture of conveyance
 Section 5: Knowingly receiving ransom
 Section 6: Knowingly negotiating to obtain, or for payment of, ransom
 Section 7: Power to freeze bank account
 Section 8: Public Prosecutor’s power to order inspection of books, accounts, receipts, vouchers or other documents
 Section 9: Public Prosecutor’s powers to obtain information
 Section 10: Duty to give information to police
 Section 11: Power to intercept communication
 Section 12: Remand in custody of police
 Section 13: Evidence of accomplice
 Section 14: Evidence of pecuniary resources or property
 Section 15: Protection of informers
 Section 16: Admission of statements in evidence

References

External links
 Kidnapping Act 1961 

1961 in Malayan law
Malaysian federal legislation